John Quigley may refer to:

John Quigley (author) (born 1925), Scottish novelist
John B. Quigley (born 1940), professor of law at the Ohio State University and writer
John Quigley (politician) (born 1948), lawyer and member of the Western Australian Legislative Assembly
John Quigley (hurler) (born 1949), former Irish sportsperson who played hurling
John Quigley (Pennsylvania official), Pennsylvania Secretary of Environmental Protection
John Quigley (producer), American film director, producer, editor, and writer
John Quigley (rower), Australian rower
Johnny Quigley (1935–2004), Scottish footballer for Nottingham Forest